The Sanjak of Siroz or Serres (Ottoman Turkish: Sancak-i/Liva-i Siroz;) was a second-level Ottoman province (sanjak or liva) encompassing the region around the town of Serres (Turkish: Siroz, now in Greece) in central Macedonia.

History
Serres fell to the Ottoman Empire on 19 September 1383, and initially formed a fief of Evrenos Beg, who brought in Yörük settlers from Sarukhan. Although never rising to particular prominence within the Ottoman Empire, Serres became also the site of a mint from 1413/14 on. In the 18th and early 19th centuries, Serres was an autonomous beylik under a succession of derebeys, within the Sanjak of Salonica.

Siroz became a regular province by 1846, during the Tanzimat reforms, as a sanjak of the Salonica Eyalet (later Salonica Vilayet), encompassing the towns of Drama, Melnik, Timurhisar (Sidirokastro), Nevrekop (Gotse Delchev) and Lissa. Drama was created as a separate sanjak centre shortly after, and by 1912, the last year of its existence, the sanjak of Serres encompassed the kazas of Serres proper, Zihne (Nea Zichni), Melnik, Razlik (Razlog), Petrich, Timurhisar (Sidirokastro), Djuma-i Bala (Blagoevgrad) and Nevrekop (Gotse Delchev).

The province was dissolved when occupied by Bulgarian troops in the First Balkan War. In 1913, after the Second Balkan War, the town of Serres and the southern half of the sanjak became part of Greece.

Demographics
According to the 1881–1882 and the 1905–1906 census of the Ottoman Empire, the population of the Sanjak of Siroz is distributed, as follows:

References

Macedonia under the Ottoman Empire
Siroz
Siroz
History of Serres
States and territories established in the 1840s
States and territories disestablished in 1912
Salonica vilayet
1840s establishments in the Ottoman Empire
1912 disestablishments in the Ottoman Empire